Woodbury is a town in Cannon County, Tennessee, United States. The population of Woodbury was 2,680 at the 2010 census. It is the county seat of Cannon County.

Geography
Woodbury is a small town located near the center of Cannon County at  (35.823644, -86.070268). It is in the valley of the East Fork of the Stones River, part of the Cumberland River watershed flowing through Nashville.

U.S. Route 70S passes through the town, leading west  to Murfreesboro and southeast  to McMinnville. Tennessee State Route 53 leads south from Woodbury  to Manchester and north  to Liberty. From the west side of Woodbury, Tennessee State Route 145 leads north  to Auburntown.

Climate
The climate of Woodbury is a wet subtropical (Köppen Cfa) one with mild winters and hot summers. The diurnal temperature variation is unusual for such a rainy low-altitude climate, which leads to it having record highs and lows extreme for Tennessee; the temperature amplitude is 138 °F. Under the Trewartha climate classification, it is a temperate oceanic (Do) climate due to only 7 months having a mean 50 °F (10 °C) or higher.

Demographics

2020 census

As of the 2020 United States census, there were 2,703 people, 1,139 households, and 609 families residing in the town.

2010 census
As of the census of 2010, there were 2,680 people, 1,052 households, and 608 families residing in the town. The population density was 1,552.0 people per square mile (541.9/km2). There were 1,159 housing units at an average density of 671.1 per square mile (258.7/km2). The racial makeup of the town was 94.36% White, 3.83% African American, 0.54% Native American, 0.04% Asian, 0.04% Pacific Islander, 0.41% from other races, and 0.78% from two or more races. Hispanic or Latino of any race were 2.35% of the population.

There were 1,052 households, out of which 27.3% had children under the age of 18 living with them, 37.1% were married couples living together, 16.6% had a female householder with no husband present, and 42.2% were non-families. 39.5% of all households were made up of individuals, and 19.7% had someone living alone who was 65 years of age or older. The average household size was 2.16 and the average family size was 2.88.

In the town, the population was spread out, with 23.1% under the age of 18, 10.2% from 18 to 24, 23.4% from 25 to 44, 21.7% from 45 to 64, and 21.6% who were 65 years of age or older. The median age was 40 years. For every 100 females, there were 80.0 males. For every 100 females age 18 and over, there were 71.8 males.

The median income for a household in the town was $23,846, and the median income for a family was $33,889. Males had a median income of $28,636 versus $19,231 for females. The per capita income for the town was $17,557. About 17.9% of families and 23.1% of the population were below the poverty line, including 34.2% of those under age 18 and 24.5% of those age 65 or over.

Festivals & Fairs
There are a few festivals in Woodbury. The most notable taking place each spring, is known as "The Good Ole Days". The Cannon County Fair also happens in May each year at the Cannon County Fairgrounds. Other festivals include the Cannon County Christmas Business Open House and a weekly "Cruise-In" on the square.

References

External links
Woodbury offices – Cannon County website
Town charter

Towns in Cannon County, Tennessee
Towns in Tennessee
County seats in Tennessee